İrem Derici (born 21 March 1987) is a Turkish singer and songwriter. From the early 2010s she became famous in Turkey through her hit singles "Zorun Ne Sevgilim", "Kalbimin Tek Sahibine" and "Dantel".

Life and career 
İrem Derici was born on 21 March 1987, her parents are Hulusi Derici and Jale Ediz. At the age of four she started to play piano, and later had piano lessons at Mimar Sinan Fine Arts University State Conservatory High School. She graduated sociology at Istanbul Bilgi University, and also studied master of Marketing Communication. 

She participated in the singing competition O Ses Türkiye and advanced to the semi-final stage. Meanwhile, she began to perform at different places in Turkey with a group named Monopop.

With the release of the single "Bensiz Yapamazsın" in 2012 Derici started her professional music career. In May 2013, her second single "Düşler Ülkesinin Gelgit Akıllısı" was released. In September 2013, her first maxi single İki was released. The album's first music video was made for "Sevgi Olsun Taştan Olsun", followed by another music video for "Zorun Ne Sevgilim". "Zorun Ne Sevgilim" remained number two on Türkçe Top 20 for three weeks. Derici then released a new single titled "Neredesin Sen?", written by Neşet Ertaş.

In 2014, her single "Kalbimin Tek Sahibine" became a massive hit in Turkey and was viewed by millions on YouTube. In the same year her second maxi single Üç was released, and two music videos were made for the songs "Bir miyiz?" and "Nabza Göre Şerbet". "Nabza Göre Şerbet" ranked third on Turkey's official music chart. In 2015, two more singles "Değmezsin Ağlamaya" and "Aşk Eşittir Biz" were released in March and September respectively. "Aşk Eşittir Biz" became a number one hit in Turkey. In the same year, Derici collaborated with Emrah Karaduman in his album Tozduman and was featured in the song "Nerden Bilecekmiş".

Derici, released her first studio album Dantel in February 2016 under the label GNL Entertainment. The song "Dantel" from the album, was the number-one hit in Turkey for four continuous weeks. The second music video for the album was made for the song "Evlenmene Bak" in which Sinan Akçıl appeared. Subsequently, a third and forth music video were made for the songs "Dur Yavaş" and "Bana Hiçbir Şey Olmaz".

From 13 September 2014 to 22 March 2016, Derici was married to the arranger Rıza Esendemir. From 11 July to 21 September 2016, she served as a judge on the second season of the singing competition Rising Star Türkiye.

In 2017 she collaborated with Mustafa Ceceli in his album Zincirimi Kırdı Aşk and was featured in the song "Kıymetlim". Together with Gökçe, Derici was featured in the music video for Yonca Evcimik's new single "Kendine Gel". In the same year, she released a new single titled "Tektaş", which ranked eighth on Turkey's official music chart. Later she voiced the song "Sevimli" for the soundtrack of the movie Bekâr Bekir. In November, Derici released the single "Bazı Aşklar Yarım Kalmalı", which rose to the third position on the official chart in Turkey.

In August 2018, her second studio album, Sabıka Kaydı, was released. A music video was published on the same day for the album's lead single "Ben Tek Siz Hepiniz". In February 2019, Derici released her tenth single "Meftun", and on 31 May 2019 she released her first cover album Mest Of, which contains eight popular Turkish songs from the 90s. Mayk Şişman from Milliyet believed that Derici's new album was 'successful as an idea' and named "Bende Hüküm Sür" as its best piece.

Discography

Studio albums

Cover albums

Compilation albums

EPs

Singles

Other works

Filmography 
Cinema
 Bekâr Bekir (2017)

Television
 O Ses Türkiye (2011) – Herself (contestant)
 İşte Benim Stilim (2016) – Herself (guest judge)
 İrem Derici ile Eğlenmene Bak (2017) – Herself (presenter)
 Jet Sosyete (2018) – Herself
 Kalk Gidelim (2019) – Herself
 Menajerimi Ara'' (2020/2021) – Herself

References

External links 
 
 

1987 births
Living people
Istanbul Bilgi University alumni
Turkish pop singers
21st-century Turkish singers
21st-century Turkish women singers
Turkish lyricists